The Hong Kong–Taiwan Economic and Cultural Co-operation and Promotion Council (ECCPC) represents the Government of Hong Kong in talks with Taiwan, through its counterpart, the Taiwan–Hong Kong Economic and Cultural Co-operation Council (ECCC).

The ECCPC was set up on 1 April 2010 in a symbiotic relationship with the Taiwanese ECCC, similar to that between bodies representing Taiwan and mainland China in cross-strait talks, under a slightly hands-off approach that is often known as the "white glove" policy. The two councils, both with participation by high-ranking ministers, are incorporated as legal entities but will be authorised by the two governments to sign pacts.

The two bodies were established against a background of strengthened Hong Kong-Taiwan links and trade, which match improved China-Taiwan relations. With the establishment in 2009 of direct flights between Taiwan and the mainland, Hong Kong's role as a transit point was eliminated.

The ECCPC has only one major committee, the Business Co-operation Committee, reflecting the Hong Kong government's focus on business and economic aspects of the relationship, such as seeking mutual avoidance of double taxation and collaboration between the two financial markets. This contrasts with the broader agenda of the Taiwanese side, which is looking for progress on matters such as infectious disease control, relaxation of visa requirements for travellers and cultural exchanges. The committee chair, for a term of two years, is David Lie Tai-chong, also a vice-chairman of the ECCPC itself and a Hong Kong delegate to the Chinese People's Political Consultative Conference.

ECCPC is located at the Central Government Offices in Admiralty.

History 
In August 2022, after Nancy Pelosi visited Taiwan, John Lee criticized the visit and said "The Hong Kong government would fully support and facilitate all necessary measures by Beijing to safeguard national sovereignty and territorial integrity." David Lie, head of the ECCPC, said that the development would have little impact on Hong Kong, and said interactions between the ECCPC and ECCC had been limited since 2019, when Hong Kong pushed for the 2019 Hong Kong extradition bill.

Transportation
The council is accessible within walking distance North from Admiralty station of Hong Kong MTR.

See also

 Taiwan–Hong Kong Economic and Cultural Co-operation Council
 Political status of Taiwan
 Economic Cooperation Framework Agreement (between Taiwan and China)
 List of diplomatic missions of Taiwan
 Consular missions in Hong Kong

References

External links
 Hong Kong–Taiwan Economic and Cultural Co-operation and Promotion Council

2010 establishments in Hong Kong
Politics of Hong Kong
Politics of Taiwan
Organizations established in 2010
Hong Kong–Taiwan relations